Franz Hofer (4 September 1918 – December 1990) was an Austrian footballer.

References

External links
 DFB
 

1918 births
1990 deaths
Austrian footballers
German footballers
Germany international footballers
Association football forwards
SK Rapid Wien players
Place of birth missing